Gopal Ramalingam Memorial Engineering College is a co-educational institution located in Chennai, Tamil Nadu, India. the college have been approved by the All India Council for Technical Education (AICTE).

Courses
Gopal Ramalingam Memorial Engineering College is part of the Sri Krishna Group of Institutions. Courses Offered include;

B.E. - Aeronautical Engineering
B.E. - Mechanical Engineering

Facilities
Facilities include;

Infrastructure Facilities
Lab Facilities
Library Facilities
Hostel Facilities
Transport Facilities

References

External links

Engineering colleges in Chennai